Joséphine Bacon (born April 23, 1947), is an Innu poet from Pessamit in Quebec. She publishes in French and Innu-aimun. She has also curated an exhibit at the Grande Bibliothèque in Montreal, Quebec and teaches at Kiuna Institution in Odanak.

Life and career 
Bacon was born in the Innu community of Pessamit in 1947 and spent the first five years of her life out on the land with her family before entering boarding school in Maliotenam. In the 1960s she moved to Quebec City where she worked as a secretary, later attending secretarial school in Ottawa run by the Office of Aboriginal Affairs. She moved to Montreal in 1968 and later became a translator and transcriber for anthropologists interviewing important Innu elders and knowledge keepers in Labrador and Quebec.

She is the subject of Kim O'Bomsawin's 2020 documentary film Call Me Human (Je m'appelle humain).

Works
Désobéissons ! Eka pashishtetau !. Tinqueux : Éditions du Centre de créations pour l'enfance, 2019
Uiesh |Quelque part. Montréal, Mémoire d’encrier, 2018
A tea in the tundra = Nipishapui nete mushuat. translated by Donald Winkler. Bookland Press, 2017
Guetter l'aurore : littératures et résistances, 1944-2014. Genouilleux: Passe du Vent, 2014
Akin Kadipendag Trickster. Montreal: Possible Editions, 2014
Mingan my village : poems by Innu schoolchildren. translated by Solange Messier. Fifth House Publishers, 2014
Un thé dans la toundra = Nipishapui nete mushuat. Mémoire d'encrier, 2013
Mingan, mon village : poèmes d'écoliers innus. co-authored with Rogé,Laure Morali, Rita Mestokosho. Éditions de la Bagnole,2012
Nous sommes tous des sauvages. co-authored with José Acquelin. Mémoire d'encrier, 2011
Bâtons à message| Message Sticks | Thissinuashitakana. Montreal: Mémoire d'encrier, 2010
La créature des neiges = Kunapeu. Bibliothèque et Archives nationales du Québec, 2008

Filmography

Bacon has directed one documentary, and has worked as a translator and narrator in documentaries by film maker Arthur Lamothe and Gilles Carle, including:
Tshishe Mishtikuashisht - Le petit grand européen : Johan Beetz (1997)
Ameshkuatan - Les sorties du castor (1978)

Her first documentary film, about a meeting between Innu elders and clan mothers from Kahnawake, has been lost.

Awards and distinctions

  in the category of Quebecois poetry for her work Uiesh / Quelque part, 2019
 Indigenous Voices Awards, in the category of works published in French, 2019
 Officer of l’Ordre de Montréal, 2018
 Champion of the Order of Arts and Letters of Quebec, 2018
 Prix International Ostana – écritures en langue maternelle, 2017
 Reader's Prize at the Montreal Poetry Market for her poem "Dessine-moi l’arbre", 2010 
 Honorary doctorate from Laval University, 2016. 
 Governor General's Award finalist for Un thé dans la toundra/Nipishapui nete mushuat, 2014
 Grand Prix du livre de Montréal finalist for Un thé dans la toundra/Nipishapui nete mushuat, 2014

References

External links
 Bacon at kwahiatonhk, 2020

Living people
1947 births
21st-century translators
21st-century Canadian women writers
21st-century Canadian poets
21st-century First Nations writers
First Nations poets
First Nations women writers
Canadian women poets
Innu people
Writers from Quebec